The Grainger Formation is a geologic formation in Tennessee, Kentucky, and Virginia. It preserves fossils dating back to the early Mississippian subperiod of the Carboniferous period.

See also

 List of fossiliferous stratigraphic units in Tennessee
 List of fossiliferous stratigraphic units in Kentucky
 List of fossiliferous stratigraphic units in Virginia
 Paleontology in Tennessee
 Paleontology in Kentucky
 Paleontology in Virginia

References

 

Carboniferous geology of Tennessee
Carboniferous Kentucky
Carboniferous geology of Virginia